The Dipteridaceae is a family of ferns in the order Gleicheniales of the class Polypodiopsida.  They are commonly known as umbrella ferns and contain two genera, Cheiropleuria and Dipteris, with a total of nine species confined to Asia, New Guinea and northern Australia While currently a small family, they were much more abundant in the Mesozoic era, with the oldest fossils being known from the Middle Triassic of Italy, Australia and Argentina. Seven fossil genera are recognised, including Hausmannia, Clathropteris, Dictyophyllum, Thaumatopteris, Camptopteris, and Polyphacelus.

The following diagram shows the placement of Dipteridaceae in a likely phylogenic relationship with the other two families of Gleicheniales.

References

Gleicheniales
Fern families